King Cool is the second album by Donnie Iris, released in 1981.  The album was reissued in remastered form on CD in 2021 by Rock Candy Records with a live bonus track from the 1981 Live EP.

Track listing

Side one
 "Sweet Merilee" (Avsec, Iris) - 3:37
 "The Promise" (Lee) - 4:06
 "Pretender" (Avsec, Iris) - 5:15
 "Love Is Like a Rock" (Avsec, Iris, Lee, McClain, Valentine) - 3:35
 "That's the Way Love Ought to Be" (Avsec, Iris) - 4:19

Side two
 "My Girl" (Avsec, Iris) - 3:59
 "Broken Promises" (Avsec, Iris) - 4:21
 "King Cool" (Avsec, Iris) - 4:05
 "Color Me Blue" (Avsec, Iris) - 5:19
 "The Last to Know" (Avsec, Iris) - 5:19

2021 remastered CD reissue
 "Sweet Merilee" - 3:42
 "The Promise" - 4:08
 "Pretender" - 5:14
 "Love Is Like a Rock" - 3:38
 "That's the Way Love Ought to Be" - 4:23
 "My Girl" - 4:00
 "Broken Promises" - 4:19
 "King Cool" - 4:07
 "Color Me Blue" - 5:20
 "The Last to Know" - 5:21
 "Shock Treatment (Live)" - 4:44

Personnel

Donnie Iris and the Cruisers
Donnie Iris - lead and background vocals
Mark Avsec - piano, organ, synthesizers, glockenspiel, background vocals
Marty Lee Hoenes - guitars and background vocals
Albritton McClain - bass guitar and background vocals
Kevin Valentine - drums and percussion

Additional musicians
Kenny Blake - saxophone

Production
Executive Producer: Carl Maduri
Producer: Mark Avsec
Engineer: Jerry Reed
Mixed by Michael Barbiero at Mediasound Studios, New York

Chart positions
Album - Billboard (United States)

Singles - Billboard (United States)

References

Donnie Iris albums
1981 albums
Albums produced by Mark Avsec
MCA Records albums